"No Son of Mine" is a song by British rock group Genesis, released as the lead single from their 14th album, We Can't Dance (1991). The song reached  6 on the UK Singles Chart and No. 12 on the US Billboard Hot 100 (the band's first not to enter the top 10 since 1984's "Taking It All Too Hard"). It was also a top-10 hit in several European countries and peaked atop Canada's RPM Top Singles chart for five weeks.

Lyrics and music
The song's lyrics tell the story of a boy who runs away from his abusive home, and—after some reconsideration—attempts to return, only to be rebuked by his father. In interviews, Phil Collins has said that the lyrics are deliberately vague as to whether the narrator or his mother is the victim of the abuse.

The song has a distinctive sound heard during the intro and before the second verse. Referred to by the band as "elephantus", the sound was created by Tony Banks recording Mike Rutherford's guitar with a sampler and then playing three notes on the bottom register of the keyboard, greatly lowering the pitch. The working title of "No Son of Mine" was "Elephantus". The sound is also featured in the opening of the "I Can't Dance" single B-side "On the Shoreline". A similar sound is heard in former Genesis member Peter Gabriel's song "I Grieve", which was released a few years later, on the soundtrack to City of Angels.

The single included the eighth track from We Can't Dance, "Living Forever", as the B-side. The radio edit fades out the song's extended outro a minute in advance and deletes part of the second chorus. The music video makes use of the complete album version.

Music video
The video for this song is melancholic, illustrating the scene in sepia tone. The video depicts what is discussed in the song, which is a conversation between a son and his father. During the last chorus, snowflakes begin appearing flying around the house; eventually, at the end, the scene pulls out to reveal that the scenes of confrontation have taken place in a snow globe that the son is holding. It was done by FYI (director Jim Yukich and producer Paul Flattery).

Live performances
A live version appears on the albums The Way We Walk, Volume One: The Shorts, and Live Over Europe 2007, as well as on their DVDs The Way We Walk - Live in Concert and When in Rome 2007.

Track listings
7-inch and cassette single
 "No Son of Mine"
 "Living Forever"

12-inch and CD single
 "No Son of Mine"
 "Living Forever"
 "Invisible Touch" (live)

Personnel
 Phil Collins – drums, lead and backing vocals
 Tony Banks – keyboards
 Mike Rutherford – lead, rhythm and bass guitars

Charts

Weekly charts

Year-end charts

References

1990s ballads
1991 singles
1991 songs
Atlantic Records singles
Genesis (band) songs
RPM Top Singles number-one singles
Songs about families
Songs written by Mike Rutherford
Songs written by Phil Collins
Songs written by Tony Banks (musician)
Virgin Records singles